The 1900 New Mexico A&M Aggies football team was an American football team that represented New Mexico College of Agriculture and Mechanical Arts (now known as New Mexico State University) as an independent during the 1900 college football season. In their first and only year under head coach William A. Sutherland, the Aggies compiled a 3–3–1 record and outscored opponents by a total of 49 to 27.

Schedule

References

New Mexico AandM
New Mexico State Aggies football seasons
New Mexico AandM Aggies football